The Derby Stakes, also known as the Epsom Derby or the Derby, and  as the Cazoo Derby for sponsorship reasons, is a Group 1 flat horse race in England open to three-year-old colts and fillies. It is run at Epsom Downs Racecourse in Surrey on the first Saturday of June each year, over a distance of one mile, four furlongs and 6 yards (2,420 metres). It was first run in 1780.

It is Britain's richest flat horse race, and the most prestigious of the five Classics. It is sometimes referred to as the "Blue Riband" of the turf. The race serves as the middle leg of the historically significant Triple Crown of British horse racing, preceded by the 2000 Guineas and followed by the St Leger, although the feat of winning all three is rarely attempted in the modern era due to changing priorities in racing and breeding, and the demands it places on horses.

The name "Derby" (deriving from the sponsorship of the Earl of Derby) has been borrowed many times, notably by the Kentucky Derby in the United States. The name "Epsom Derby" is often used in the United States, in order to differentiate The Derby from races such as the Kentucky Derby or Florida Derby. The Derby run at Epsom is usually referred to as "the Derby" in Great Britain. It is one of Britain's great national sporting events and has a large worldwide TV audience.

History
The Stanley family, Earls of Derby, had a long history of horse-racing, and James Stanley, 7th Earl of Derby, who gained the Lordship of Mann in 1627, instituted horse-racing on the Langness Peninsula on the Isle of Man, donating a cup for what became known as the "Manx Derby".
 
The Derby originated at a celebration following the first running of the Oaks Stakes in 1779. A new race was planned, and it was decided that it should be named after either the host of the party, the 12th Earl of Derby, or one of his guests, Sir Charles Bunbury (the Bunbury Cup run at Newmarket would later be named in his honour). According to legend the decision was made by the toss of a coin, but it is probable that Bunbury, the Steward of the Jockey Club, deferred to his host. The inaugural running of the Derby was held on Thursday 4 May 1780. It was won by Diomed, a colt owned by Sir Charles Bunbury, who collected prize money of £1,065 15s. The first four runnings were contested over 1 mile, but this was amended to the current distance of 1½ miles in 1784. Lord Derby achieved his first success in the event in 1787, with a horse called Sir Peter Teazle.

The starting point of the race was moved twice during the 19th century. The first move, suggested by Lord George Bentinck, was in 1848, and the second was in 1872. It was discovered in 1991 that the exact length of the race was one mile, four furlongs and 10 yards.

Initially, the Derby was run on a Thursday in late May or early June, depending on when Easter occurred. In 1838 the race was moved to a Wednesday to fit in with the railways' timetables, but still followed the moveable feast of Easter. In the 20th century, the race was run mainly on a Wednesday in late May or early June until 1994, after which it was changed to a Saturday in early June. From 1915 to 1918 (during World War I), it was on a Tuesday, with the race's latest ever date being 31 July 1917. From 1942 to 1945 (during World War II), 1947 to 1950, and in 1953, the race was run on a Saturday. From 1969 to 1994, it was on the first Wednesday in June. From 2003 to at least 2022, it has been on the first Saturday in June, apart from a race on 4 July 2020 without spectators, owing to COVID-19

The Derby has been run at Epsom in all years except during the world wars; from 1915 to 1918 and from 1940 to 1945, the Derby was run at Newmarket as the 'New Derby'.

With the race's close association with gambling, the most controversial running of the Epsom Derby took place in 1844. The winner, Running Rein, was disqualified on discovery that a four-year-old imposter, a horse by the name Maccabeus, had been substituted in his place as part of a betting coup.

The Derby has inspired many similar events around the world. European variations include the Derby Italiano, the Deutsches Derby, the Irish Derby and the Prix du Jockey Club (popularly known in the British Isles as the "French Derby"). Several races in the United States include the "Derby" name, including the oldest, the Kentucky Derby. Other national equivalents include the Australian Derby, the New Zealand Derby, and the Japanese Derby.

In 1931, the Derby became the world's first outdoor sporting event to be televised.

Epsom Fair

For many years the Derby was run on a Wednesday or a Thursday and on the day huge crowds would come from London, not only to see the race but to enjoy other entertainment (during some of the 19th century and most of the 20th, Parliament would adjourn to allow members to attend the meeting).

By the time that Charles Dickens visited Epsom Downs to view the race in the 1850s, entertainers such as musicians, clowns, and conjurers plied their trades and entertained the crowds; other forms of entertainment included coconut stalls. The crowded meeting was the subject of a painting by William Powell Frith painted in the 1858 and titled The Derby Day; critics have noted that the foreground of the painting features the entertainment attractions, while the racing is relegated to the margins.

In the 1870s, the steam-driven rides were introduced. They were located at the Tattenham Corner end of the grounds and the fair was on for ten days and entertained hundreds of thousands. During the latter half of the 20th century, Derby Day became less popular and the race was moved from Wednesday to Saturday in 1995 with the hope of reviving high attendance. As the number of people attending the fair dwindled in the face of competition for attention and changing tastes, its length was reduced from 10 days to three or four.

Modern format

Today, the free-admission Hill still provides a festival atmosphere with a fairground in operation on the Friday and Saturday. The walk-in nature of the Hill typically sees Derby attendances exceed 100,000 spectators, making it one of the largest sporting events in  the United Kingdom.

Sponsorship
From the 2021 running the race, along with seven other races at the Derby festival, will be sponsored by Cazoo. Investec was the previous sponsor of the Derby between 2009 and 2020. The race was previously backed by Ever Ready (1984–94) and Vodafone (1995–2008).

Popular culture
 The 1952 drama film Derby Day, directed by Herbert Wilcox and starring Michael Wilding and Anna Neagle, is set entirely around The Derby.
 The Derby is also the setting for the series 2 finale of BBC television's Peaky Blinders.
 The Derby race features as a plot in a stage show in the film Yankee Doodle Dandy where James Cagney performs a wonderful song and dance routine.

|}

Records
Leading jockey (9 wins)
 Lester Piggott – Never Say Die (1954), Crepello (1957), St. Paddy (1960), Sir Ivor (1968), Nijinsky (1970), Roberto (1972), Empery (1976), The Minstrel (1977), Teenoso (1983)

Leading trainer (8 wins)
 Aidan O'Brien – Galileo (2001), High Chaparral (2002), Camelot (2012), Ruler of the World (2013), Australia (2014), Wings of Eagles (2017), Anthony Van Dyck (2019), Serpentine (2020)

Leading owner (9 wins): (includes part ownership)
 Sue Magnier, Michael Tabor – Galileo (2001), High Chaparral (2002), Pour Moi (2011), Camelot (2012), Ruler Of The World (2013), Australia (2014), Wings of Eagles (2017), Anthony Van Dyck (2019), Serpentine (2020)

Dams of two winners
 Flyer (Rhadamanthus and Daedalus)
 Highflyer mare, known as Eagle's Dam, (Didelot and Spread Eagle)
 Horatia (Archduke and Paris)
 Arethusa (Ditto and Pan)
 Penelope (Whalebone and Whisker)
 Canopus mare (Lap-dog and Spaniel)
 Arcot Lass (St. Giles and Bloomsbury)
 Emma (Mündig and Cotherstone)
 Morganette (Galtee More and Ard Patrick)
 Perdita II (Persimmon and Diamond Jubilee)
 Windmill Girl (Blakeney and Morston)
 Urban Sea (Galileo and Sea the Stars)

Other records
 Fastest winning time (at Epsom) – 2m 31.33s, Workforce (2010)
 Widest winning margin – 10 lengths, Shergar (1981)
 Longest odds winners – Jeddah (1898), Signorinetta (1908), Aboyeur (1913), 100/1
 Shortest odds winner – Ladas (1894), 2/9
 Most runners – 34 (1862)
 Fewest runners – 4 (1794)

Winners

 Winning distances are shown in lengths or shorter (dh = dead-heat; shd = short-head; hd = head; snk = short-neck; nk = neck).

Timeline

 1805: One of the horses was brought down by a spectator.
 1825: Middleton never raced before or after winning the Derby.
 1838: Amato never raced before or after winning the Derby.
 1844: The original winner Running Rein was disqualified as he was actually an ineligible four-year-old horse named Maccabeus.
 1881: Iroquois became the first American-bred to win a leg of the British triple crown.
 1884: The race finished with a dead-heat between Harvester and St. Gatien.
 1887: Merry Hampton is the most recent horse to win the Derby with no previous victories.
 1894: The winner was owned by the Prime Minister at the time, the 5th Earl of Rosebery.
 1901: The first year in which a mechanical starting gate was used.
 1909: Minoru was the first Derby winner owned by a reigning monarch, King Edward VII, who had previously won twice as Prince of Wales.
 1913: The 6/4 favourite Craganour, owned by Charles B. Ismay, brother of J. Bruce Ismay of the Titanic, was controversially disqualified, and the race was awarded to the 100/1 outsider Aboyeur. Suffragette Emily Davison was struck by King George V's horse, Anmer, she died four days later.
 1916: Fifinella, who also won The Oaks, is the most recent (as of 2022) of six fillies to win the race. The previous five were Eleanor (1801), Blink Bonny (1857), Shotover (1882), Signorinetta (1908), Tagalie (1912).
 1921: The winner Humorist died two weeks after the race.
 1927: The first Derby to be broadcast by the BBC.
 1931: The first outdoor sporting event ever televised (by John Logie Baird and his company using the BBC's transmitter).
 1932: April the Fifth is the most recent winner trained at Epsom.
 1946: Airborne is the most recent (as of 2017) of four grey horses to win the Derby.
 1953: Pinza was the only winner in the race for the jockey Sir Gordon Richards, after 27 unsuccessful attempts.
 1960: Although there had been an experimental TV transmission of the race in the early 1930s, regular television coverage of the Derby began this year, initially on both BBC and ITV.
 1962: Larkspur wins at odds of 22/1 after seven horses are bought down nearing Tattenham Corner; one horse is killed and four jockeys are detained in hospital. 
 1967: Starting stalls used for the first time.
 1989: The runner-up Terimon is the longest-priced horse to finish placed in the Derby, at odds of 500/1.
 1996: Alex Greaves became the first female jockey to ride in the race. She finished last of the 20 runners on the filly Portuguese Lil.
 1998: The most recent (as of 2019) filly to take part, the 1,000 Guineas winner Cape Verdi, started as 11/4 favourite but could only finish ninth.
 2006: Martin Dwyer's winning ride on Sir Percy subsequently won the Lester Award for "Flat Ride of the Year".
 2007: Authorized provided jockey Frankie Dettori with his first winner in the Derby after 14 previous attempts.
 2008: Jim Bolger, the trainer of the winner New Approach, had left the horse entered for the race "by mistake", having not initially intended to run.
 2010: Workforce broke the Epsom track record winning in the time 2m 31.33s previously held by Lammtarra who set it in 1995 at 2m 32.31s.
 2012: Aidan O'Brien and his 19-year-old son Joseph became the first father-son/trainer-jockey combination to win the race. Hayley Turner became the second female jockey to ride in the race, on Cavaleiro, finishing last of the nine horses which went to post, the lowest number since 1907.
 2014: Aidan O'Brien became the first person to train three consecutive winners of the race.
 2017: Ana O'Brien, daughter of Aidan, was the third female jockey to ride in the race, on The Anvil. By finishing 17th of the 18 runners, she became the first woman to beat another runner to the line.

See also
 Derby (horse race)
 Horse racing in Great Britain
 List of British flat horse races

References

Further reading

External links

Paris-Turf
 Racing Post:
 "The Blue Ribbon of the Turf" (1890) OpenLibrary.org
 The Derby Stakes (Englisches Derby) Liste de Sieger 
 Derby  Horse Racing History Online
 ifhaonline.org International Federation of Horseracing Authorities – Investec Derby Stakes 2019
 DERBY STAKES – EPSOM DOWNS: GREAT BRITAIN – Grade I Pedigree Online
 YouTube Race Video
 Investec Epsom Derby Festival The title sponsor, Investec

 
Annual sporting events in the United Kingdom
1780 establishments in England
Epsom and Ewell
Epsom Downs Racecourse
Flat horse races for three-year-olds
Flat races in Great Britain
Recurring sporting events established in 1780
Sport in Surrey
Triple Crown of Thoroughbred Racing
British Champions Series
June sporting events